Mirto Lenín Davoine Genta (13 February 1933- December 1999) was a Uruguayan football defender who played for Uruguay in the 1954 FIFA World Cup. He also played for C.A. Peñarol. He died in 1999.

References

External links
 FIFA profile

1933 births
1999 deaths
Uruguayan footballers
Uruguay international footballers
Association football defenders
Uruguayan Primera División players
Peñarol players
1954 FIFA World Cup players